The Ministry of Housing and Urban-Rural Development is a ministry of the People's Republic of China which provides housing and regulates the state construction activities in Mainland China. It was formerly known as the Ministry of Construction.

History
As part of US$586 billion economic stimulus package of November 2008, the government plans to:

Housing: increase the construction of more affordable and low-rent housing and the speeding up of slum demolition, to initiate a pilot program to rebuild rural homes, and a program to encourage nomads to move into permanent housing.
Rural infrastructure: improve roads and power grids in the countryside, and drinking water, including a huge project to divert water from the South to the North of China. Also, poverty relief initiatives will be strengthened.

List of Ministers

See also
Urban Planning Society of China
Ministries of China

References

External links 
 

Housing and Urban-Rural Construction
China
China
China
China